Thomas Kinsella (December 31, 1832 – February 11, 1884) was an American printer and politician who served one term as a United States representative from New York from 1871 to 1873.

Biography 
Born in County Wexford, Ireland. Brother of Matthew Kinsella born in Kilnahue, Gorey, Co.Wexford 1836. He emigrated to the United States and settled in New York City, where he attended the common schools.

Career 
He moved to Cambridge, New York, in 1851 and learned the printer's trade; he worked for the Cambridge Post, and moved to Brooklyn in 1858, becoming editor of the Brooklyn Daily Eagle on September 7, 1861. He was postmaster of Brooklyn in 1866, and was a member of the city water commission and board of education.

Congress 
Kinsella was elected as a Democrat to the Forty-second Congress, holding office from March 4, 1871, to March 3, 1873. He was not a candidate for renomination in 1872.

Later career and death 
He established the Brooklyn Sunday Sun in 1874; it afterward combined with the Daily Eagle, which he edited until his death in Brooklyn, 1884.

He was interred in Holy Cross Cemetery.

External links
 Brooklyn Daily Eagle Online. Brooklyn Public Library.

References

1832 births
1884 deaths
Politicians from Brooklyn
New York (state) postmasters
19th-century American newspaper editors
Brooklyn Eagle
Irish emigrants to the United States (before 1923)
Democratic Party members of the United States House of Representatives from New York (state)
People from County Wexford
People from Cambridge, New York
American male journalists
Journalists from New York City
19th-century American male writers
19th-century American politicians
Burials at Holy Cross Cemetery, Brooklyn
Editors of New York City newspapers